Kwangbok Station is a station on Hyŏksin Line of the Pyongyang Metro.

The station features a golden statue of Kim Il-sung as well as murals depicting slogan trees – trees engraved with revolutionary slogans from the time of the anti-Japanese struggle. One of these, an embossed mural 70 times four meters in size, is called Lake Samji in Spring.

References

External links
 

Pyongyang Metro stations
Murals in North Korea
Railway stations opened in 1978
1978 establishments in North Korea